House Clouds is an EP released by the band Liars. It was released in 2007 on Mute Records.

Track listing
 Houseclouds
 Red Dirt
 Clear Island (Tiny Liars of Today Mix)
 Dear God

References
House Clouds - Liars

2007 EPs
Liars (band) albums
Mute Records EPs